Mutaz Essa Barshim (born 24 June 1991) is a Qatari track and field athlete who competes in the high jump and is the current Olympic Champion (2020). He is also the current World Champion and second highest jumper of all-time with a personal best of 2.43. He won gold at the 2017 World Championships in London and at the 2019 World Championships in Doha. At the Olympics, Barshim originally won the full set of medals with bronze at the London 2012 Summer Olympics, silver at the 2016 Summer Olympics in Rio, and shared gold at the 2020 Summer Olympics Tokyo. He was the Asian Indoor and World Junior champion in 2010, and won the high jump gold medals at the 2011 Asian Athletics Championships and 2011 Military World Games. He holds the Asian record in high jump. In 2021, his bronze in the 2012 Summer Olympics was promoted to silver in a three-way tie for second due to the disqualification of the original gold medalist.

Mutaz jumps off his left foot, using the Fosbury Flop technique, with a pronounced backwards arch over the bar, he achieves this by looking over the landing mat. One of his brothers, Muamer, is also a high jumper.

Biography

Early life
Barshim was born in Doha in a Sudanese family. He has five brothers and a sister. His father was also a track and field athlete, which is why almost all of the Barshim children became active in this sport, except for Meshaal Barsham who later became a football goalkeeper. Barshim tried running and long jumping in his youth. He said in an IAAF interview, "I grew up, nothing special, like any kid in Qatar. I joined a club because my father was going to the club training so sometimes he used to take me there with him. I knew athletics because of my father." He attended an Arabic school in Doha, where he learned to speak English. At age of 15, he switched to high jump because it looked more fun. He began training in Doha at the Aspire Academy. He finished training at ASPIRE in 2009, when his personal best was 2.14 m. In September 2009, he met his new (and current) coach from Poland/Sweden Stanisław "Stanley" Szczyrba who started to train him in Doha. He has been his coach since and as Barshim said, "He is more than a coach, we are like father and son." During the summer season in Europe, they spent time at Szczyrba's home in Warsaw, Poland, and they also trained in Sweden so that Barshim did not have to waste time flying to and from Qatar between competitions.

Barshim enjoyed his first international successes in 2010. He set an indoor Qatari record in Gothenburg in early February with a jump of 2.25 m, and then went on to take the gold medal at the 2010 Asian Indoor Athletics Championships, winning with a clearance of 2.20 m. He was selected to represent Qatar at the 2010 IAAF World Indoor Championships in Doha and his performance of 2.23 m left him in fourteenth place in the qualifying round. These feats made him the first ever graduate of the ASPIRE Academy competing at the World Championships as well as holding the national record in an Olympic sport. In May 2010, Barshim won the Arab Athletics Championships for Juniors in Cairo, clearing an outdoor best of 2.23 m, and then went on to secure the continental junior title at the 2010 Asian Junior Athletics Championships. His winning mark at the competition (2.31 m) was a national record and a world-leading mark for junior athletes – and it was also the best jump by a junior since Huang Haiqiang cleared 2.32 m in 2006. He went on to win at the 2010 World Junior Championships in Athletics in Moncton, winning with a height of 2.30 m.

2011
He won gold in the Asian Athletics Championships in Kobe after clearing a height of 2.35 m, a new national and championship record. He continued his good form and won a gold medal at the Military World Games in Rio de Janeiro, Brazil with a 2.28 m clearance. He made his debut on the global senior stage at the 2011 World Athletics Championships in Daegu and reached the final, missing a medal on count-back and ranking seventh overall. He became high-jump champion at the Gulf Council Championships and the Arab Championships before capping off his year with yet another international gold medal at the 2011 Pan Arab Games held on home soil in Doha.

2012
At the 2012 indoor Asian Championships, held in Hangzhou, China, on 19 February 2012, Barshim won the gold medal and established a new personal best (and national record) of 2.37 m (7'9.25"), breaking the previous championship record of 2.34: it was also the highest indoor jump in the world, to date in 2012. He began jumping at 2.10 and had first try clearances at 2.15, 2.20 and 2.24, before missing once at 2.28, temporarily falling to second place when Chinese jumper Zhang Guowei cleared on his first try. Zhang then failed at 2.31, while Barshim resumed his flawless jumping with first try clears at 2.31, 2.34 and 2.37. He then failed in three attempts at 2.40.

At the 2012 Olympic Games, held in London, United Kingdom, on 7 August, Barshim won the bronze medal with a jump of 2.29, finishing in a 3-way tie for third place with Derek Drouin from Canada and Robert Grabarz from Great Britain.  In 2019 the winner of the competition, Ivan Ukhov, was stripped of the gold medal by the Court of Arbitration in Sport for doping offences and in 2021 Barshim, alongside Drouin and Grabarz, were promoted to joint silver medals for the event.

Barshim suffered a back injury in early 2012 and (later) said he was not healthy at the London Olympics. The problem was found to be a stress fracture in the fifth (L5) Lumbar vertebrae. In an interview for the IAAF in April 2013, Barshim said:  "It started hurting bad before the (2012) World Indoor Championships and then I had to stop for a bit. Before the Olympics, I had to stop again, but we have a really good sports center in Doha and I also received treatment in Warsaw."

2013
Barshim began his 2013 season indoors, in Sweden, in mid-January. He entered six competitions in Europe in 3 and a-half weeks, always jumping 2.30 or better and winning five out of the six competitions, before his back injury forced an early end. His season-best of 2.37 matched his career indoor best and was the highest in the world indoors in 2013.

He started with two "smaller" competitions in Sweden, jumping 2.30 on 13 January, and then an (early) world-leading 2.33 (7' 7 3/4") in Växjö on 20 January. He then competed in the invitation-only Moravia High Jump Tour, finishing 2nd (on misses) behind Olympic champion Ivan Ukhov as both jumped 2.30 in Hustopece on 26 January. Then Barshim won the second leg at Trinec on 29 January, tying the meet the record of 2.34. On 3 February, he won the Russian Winter Games in Moscow with yet another world-leading jump of 2.37 – which also tied his Asian indoor record from 2012 – ending that competition with a narrow miss at 2.40. He then flew to the Europa SC High Jump competition in Banska Bystrica, Slovak Republic, where his aching back restricted his jumps. In one of the strongest fields of the year, five jumpers cleared 2.30. Barshim began at 2.15, next cleared 2.30, then passed until 2.36 where his 3rd attempt clearance (only his fifth jump overall) gave him the win.

Barshim ended his indoor season on 6 February, as he did not want to risk further injury, hoping to be able to thrill his hometown fans when the IAAF's Diamond League opens its 2013 outdoor season in Doha on 10 May.

Mutaz started his outdoor season on 10 April 2013 with an "appearance" at the GCC Athletics Championships held at Doha's Khalifa International Stadium. He took only two jumps, casually running in from almost half the distance of his usual approach to clear 2.19 meters with his first attempt and then improving to 2.25 with his second. Having clinched the win, he quit to avoid hurting his back. His younger brother Muamer took second place with a jump of 2.16.

At the Prefontaine Classic Diamond League Meet in Eugene, Oregon (1 June 2013), Barshim won, being one of 3 men to clear 2.36 (7'8 3/4"), a new met record. Barshim was in the lead with no misses. After everyone missed their attempts at 2.39, Barshim, jumping last, saved his final (third) attempt for one try at new personal best of 2.40 (7' 10") and made it. He became the 8th man in history to have cleared 2.40 outdoors, and the first since 2000. His best result in 2013 was a silver medal at the 2013 IAAF World Championships in Athletics in Moscow, Russia.

2014

Barshim jumped sparingly during the 2014 Indoor season because of chronic back pain. Nonetheless, he entered the 2014 IAAF World Indoor Championships in Sopot, Poland on 8 and 9 March as favorite to medal, behind heavily favored Russian jumper Ivan Ukhov. In the Finals on Sunday 9 March, Barshim was sensational, clearing 7 consecutive heights on his first attempt, including a new Asian indoor record of 2.38m (7' 9-3/4"). Ukhov required 3 attempts to clear that height and when both men failed at 2.40m, Barshim won the gold medal, while Ukhov took silver based on the tie-breaking count-back (misses). The 22-year-old Qatari has now won a medal at the last 3 major competitions: bronze at the 2012 London Olympics, silver at the 2013 World Championships in Moscow, and gold at the 2014 World Indoor Championships in Sopot.

In early May, when the IAAF Diamond League came to his home, he had to watch as Ukhov not only bested him but moved up to equal the third highest jump ever 2.41m, while Mutaz was relegated to fourth behind Derek Drouin and Erik Kynard. On 5 June in Rome, he reversed that result, joining the group equal to third best ever at 2.41 while Ukhov finished in fifth behind the same athletes and Bohdan Bondarenko (who is also part of the group from 2013).

A week and a half later, at the Adidas Grand Prix, Icahn Stadium, New York City, Barshim and Bondarenko were locked in a tight competition. On his first attempt at 2.42m, Barshim cleared and improved his personal best and his own Asian Continental record, while setting the Diamond League record with a 2014 world-leading leap equaling Patrick Sjöberg's former world record from 1987 as the second best outdoor jump in history.   Moments later Bondarenko equaled Barshim's jump, also on his first attempt. Ukhov and Carlo Thränhardt (1988) have also jumped that height under the more controlled conditions indoors. Barshim then missed his first attempt at 2.44m. Ahead on misses, Bondarenko decided to pass at 2.44m and as a result, Barshim also passed on his remaining jumps at 2.44m and the bar was then raised to 2.46m, one centimeter above the existing world record height of 2.45m set on 27 July 1993, by Javier Sotomayor of Cuba. Both jumpers took combined five attempts at the world record height with Barshim coming closest to clearing the height on his first attempt.
Bondarenko and Barshim's jumps are the best in the world since Javier Sotomayor of Cuba cleared 2.42m in Seville on 5 June 1994. Only Sotomayor, on four occasions, has jumped higher than these two men. The two men also made multiple attempts at the record in the final Diamond League meet of the 2014 season in Brussels. Barshim again coming closest in his final attempt, clipping the bar with his heel. He won the competition with a PB of 2.43 giving him the status of being the second highest jumper of all time, behind Sotomayor's two record jumps of 2.44 and 2.45.

In the same year Mutaz also won at the 2014 Asian Indoor Athletics Championships in Hangzou, China and the 2014 Asian Games in Incheon, South Korea.

2015
In 2015, Barshim won the IAAF Diamond League in Eugene, Oregon which is also known as the Prefontaine Classic.

2016
Barshim again competed for Qatar in the Olympic Games, and earned a silver medal in high jump. That year he also won the IAAF Diamond League stops in Lausanne, Switzerland and Birmingham.

2017
Barshim competed for Qatar in the IAAF World Championships, and won the gold medal in high jump. The defending World and Olympic Champion, Derek Drouin of Canada was injured and did not participate. Additionally, he also won the IAAF Diamond League stops in Zurich, Birmingham, Paris and Shanghai in 2017.

2018
In February, at the 24th Banska Bystricia High-Jump Meet his winning streak ended after 12 first places, where he landed in second place. At the IAAF World Indoor Championships in Birmingham, UK he placed second as well. In the same year he won the IAAF Diamond League stops in Oslo and Eugene as well as the 8th Asian Indoor Athletics Championships in Tehran, Iran.

2019
In October, Barshim  became the first man to defend the World high jump title when he won in his home city of Doha with a world leading jump of 2.37m.

2021
Barshim won the Olympic gold medal at the 2020 Summer Olympics in the high jump event, the first gold medal for Qatar in athletics (and second in any sport, after weightlifter Fares El-Bakh, who won gold in the 96 kg just one day before Barshim). He is a joint gold medal winner, as he and Italian Gianmarco Tamberi cleared a height of 2.37 m in their first attempt and subsequently failed to clear 2.39 m. Both Tamberi and Barshim agreed to share the gold medal in a rare instance in Olympic history where the athletes of different nations had agreed to share the same medal. Barshim in particular was quoted for his post match presentation, asking "Can we have two golds?" and when hearing the answer was yes, embracing Tamberi saying "History, my friend".

Competition record

References

External links

 
 
 
 
Photos of Barshim 246cm World Record attempts at the Gyulai Memorial competition 2018 in Hungary

1991 births
Living people
People from Doha
Qatari male high jumpers
Olympic male high jumpers
Olympic athletes of Qatar
Olympic gold medalists for Qatar
Olympic silver medalists for Qatar
Olympic bronze medalists for Qatar
Olympic gold medalists in athletics (track and field)
Olympic silver medalists in athletics (track and field)
Olympic bronze medalists in athletics (track and field)
Athletes (track and field) at the 2012 Summer Olympics
Athletes (track and field) at the 2016 Summer Olympics
Athletes (track and field) at the 2020 Summer Olympics
Medalists at the 2012 Summer Olympics
Medalists at the 2016 Summer Olympics
Medalists at the 2020 Summer Olympics
Asian Games gold medalists for Qatar
Asian Games gold medalists in athletics (track and field)
Athletes (track and field) at the 2010 Asian Games
Athletes (track and field) at the 2014 Asian Games
Medalists at the 2010 Asian Games
Medalists at the 2014 Asian Games
World Athletics Championships athletes for Qatar
World Athletics Championships medalists
World Athletics Championships winners
World Athletics Indoor Championships winners
Asian Athletics Championships winners
Asian Indoor Athletics Championships winners
Diamond League winners
Track & Field News Athlete of the Year winners
Qatari people of Sudanese descent